The Oikya National Awami Party (alternatively the Oikya NAP or United National Awami Party) is a political party in Bangladesh. Pankaj Bhattacharya is the president of the party.

As of 2019, Asadullah Tareque was the general secretary of the party. Presidium members of the party included SMA Sobur, Aliza Hasan and Ranjit Kumar Saha. By November 2019 Harunar Rashid was the acting general secretary of the party.

The party sought recognition from the Bangladesh Election Commission in December 2017.

References

Political parties in Bangladesh